Martinelli is an Italian surname. Notable people with the surname include:

Alberto Martinelli, Italian President of the International Social Science Council
Alessandro Martinelli, Swiss footballer
Alfredo Martinelli (1899–1968), Italian film actor
Antonio Martinelli (c. 1702 – 1782), Italian violinist and composer
Anton Erhard Martinelli (1684–1747), Austrian architect
Arthur Martinelli (1881–1967), American cinematographer 
Caterina Martinelli (c. 1589 – 1608), Italian opera singer, employed by Duke Vincenzo I of Mantua 
Daniele Martinelli, Italian footballer 
Dario Martinelli (born 1974), Italian musicologist and composer
Davide Martinelli (born 1993). Italian professional road bicycle racer
Domenico Martinelli (1650–1719), Italian architect (active in Austria)
Elsa Martinelli (1935–2017), Italian actress and fashion model
Enrico Martinelli (1852–1922), Italian trumpet player, teacher and composer
Enzo Martinelli (1911–1999), Italian mathematician
Ezio Martinelli (1913–1980), American artist 
Francesca Martinelli (born 1971), Italian ski mountaineer
Franz Martinelli (1651–1708), Italian architect (active in Austria)
Fred Martinelli (1929–2021), American college football coach
Gabriel Martinelli (born 2001), Brazilian professional footballer
Gaetano Martinelli (died 1802), Italian librettist active in the court theatres of Charles Eugene, Duke of Württemberg 
Gabriella Martinelli (contemporary), Italian-Canadian film and television producer
Germaine Martinelli (1887–1964), French soprano
Gianvito Martinelli (born 1969), Italian former professional racing cyclist
Giovanni Martinelli (1600–1659), Italian painter of the Baroque era
Giovanni Martinelli (1885–1969), Italian operatic tenor
Giovanni Innocenzo Martinelli (1942–2019), Libyan bishop
Giuseppe Martinelli (born 1955), Italian professional road bicycle racer
Guido J. Martinelli Endara, Panamense economist and banker, member of the ONAREX
Jean Martinelli (1910–1983), French actor 
Joe Martinelli (1916–1991), American professional soccer player
Johann Baptist Martinelli (1701–1754), Austrian architect
Julien Martinelli (born 1980), French professional football player
Liliana Martinelli (born 1970), Argentine discus thrower
Luca Martinelli (born 1988), Italian professional football player
Lucas Martinelli Finazzi (born 1990), Italian Brazilian football midfielder
Luigi Martinelli (footballer) (born 1970), Italian professional football player
Luigi Martinelli (engineer), Italian academician, aeronautical and mechanical engineer
Manlio Martinelli (1884–1974), Italian painter, active in Livorno
Marco Martinelli (born 1965), Italian professional volleyball player
Mario Martinelli (1906 –2001), Italian politician
Marta Linares de Martinelli (born 1956), First Lady of Panama
Mateo Martinelli (born 1985), Argentine Association football midfielder
Nicola Martinellli Trometta (17th century; also called da Pesaro), Italian painter of the Baroque 
several people named Paolo Martinelli
Pietro Martinelli, Italian cyclist
Raffaello Martinelli (born 1948), Italian prelate of the Roman Catholic Church
Renzo Martinelli (born 1948), Italian film director and screenwriter
Ricardo Martinelli (born 1952), President of Panama (2009–2014)
Rosario Martinelli (1941–2013), Italian professional football midfielder
Sebastiano Martinelli (1848–1918), Italian Roman Catholic cardinal
Sheri Martinelli (1918–1996), American painter and poet
Thiago Martinelli (born 1980), Brazilian central defender
Tommaso Martinelli (1827–1888), Italian Roman Catholic cardinal
Tristano Martinelli (1555–1630), Italian actor in the commedia dell'arte tradition, probably the first to be called “Harlequin”
Vincenzo Martinelli (1737–1807), Italian painter of canvas and fresco landscapes, active in Bologna

 In fiction
 Janete Fontes Martinelli, interpreter of Liliana Castro in the Brazilian telenovela Caminhos do Coração, aired on Rede Record.
 Kate Martinelli, the fictional lesbian detective featured in novelist's Laurie R. King mysteries
 

Italian-language surnames
Patronymic surnames
Surnames from given names